The attorney-general of South Australia is the Cabinet minister in the Government of South Australia who is responsible for that state's system of law and justice. The attorney-general must be a qualified legal practitioner, although this was not always the case.

The attorney-general oversees the Attorney-General's Department. The current attorney-general since March 2022 is Kyam Maher , a member of the South Australian Labor Party.

List of attorneys-general of South Australia

See also

 Justice ministry
 Government of South Australia

References

 Statistical Record of the Legislature 1836 – 2007
 List of Australian Attorneys-General (Australian Parliamentary Library)
 Former Members of the Parliament of South Australia (Parliament of South Australia)

 
South Australia
1856 establishments in Australia
Ministers of the South Australian state government